Scorn of the Women is the debut album by Australian rock band Weddings Parties Anything. The band originally recorded it as an independent release, but on the strength of the group's ever growing live following, the group ended up being offered a recording contract and the album was released by Warners. Eight songs were by Michael Thomas, three by Dave Steel, and one was an adaptation of a poem by Berthold Brecht.

Track listing
All songs written by Mick Thomas, except where noted
 "Hungry Years" - 4:23
 "Ladies Lounge" - 2:53
 "Lost Boys" (Dave Steel) - 3:57
 "The Infanticide of Marie Farrar" (Bertolt Brecht, Mick Thomas) - 3:27
 "She Works" - 3:05
 "Scorn of the Women" - 5:22
 "Away Away" - 3:51
 "The River Is Wide" - 3:51
 "Up For Air" (Dave Steel) - 3:27
 "By Tomorrow" - 3:42
 "Woman of Ireland" - 2:45
 "Shotgun Wedding" (Dave Steel) - 5:19

Personnel

Weddings Parties Anything
 Janine Hall - bass guitar, vocals
 Marcus Schintler - drums, vocals
 Dave Steel - guitar, vocals
 Mick Thomas - guitar, vocals
 Mark Wallace - piano accordion, keyboards, vocals

Additional Musicians
 Louis McManus - guitar ("Ladies Lounge")
 Jeff Raglus - trumpet ("Scorn Of The Women")
 Michael Barclay - vocals ("Away Away")

Charts

References

1987 debut albums
ARIA Award-winning albums
Weddings Parties Anything albums